Bumper to Bumper is the second studio album from San Francisco, California, United States, alternative rock band Stroke 9. It was released on October 3, 1995.

Track listing
 "Washin' + Wonderin'"
 "All U Can Take"
 "Not Nothin'"
 "Little Black Backpack"
 "Visualize"
 "Something Else in Mind"
 "Down"
 "Bingo"
 "Refrigerator"
 "Please Wait"
 "Shake Yo Booty (Hidden Track)"

Stroke 9 albums
1995 albums